Perkins Field  is a public use government airport located two nautical miles (4 km) north of the central business district of Overton, in Clark County, Nevada, United States. Also known as Overton Municipal Airport, it is owned by the Clark County Commission and operated by the Clark County Department of Aviation. The National Plan of Integrated Airport Systems for 2011–2015 categorized it as a general aviation facility.

History
The airport was originally built in 1947 as an emergency landing area for aircraft leaving Nellis Air Force Base. Perkins Field is named for two local men, Woodruff and Elwood Perkins, who were killed during World War I and World War II.

Facilities and aircraft
Perkins Field covers an area of 250 acres (101 ha) at an elevation of 1,365 feet (416 m) above mean sea level. It has one runway designated 13/31 with an asphalt surface measuring 4,811 by 75 feet (1,466 x 23 m).

For the 12-month period ending January 31, 2011, the airport had 5,200 aircraft operations, an average of 14 per day, all general aviation. At that time there were 15 aircraft based at this airport: 80% single-engine, 13% multi-engine, and 7% ultralight.

See also
 List of airports in Nevada

References

External links
  from Nevada DOT
 Aerial image as of June 1994 from USGS The National Map
 

Airports established in 1947
Airports in Clark County, Nevada
Buildings and structures in Overton, Nevada